Hasimta Theater (lit. The Alley Theater) is a fringe theater located in the old city of Jaffa, Israel, and known for being one of the oldest fringe theaters in Israel, as it has been operating continuously since its foundation in 1982 by actor and director Niko Nitai, who had also served as the theater's artistic manager for a while. The theater attracts artists that work in theater and music and seek to examine theatrical form and expression outside the box. The current artistic director and CEO of the theater is Irit Frank.

The theater was founded by Nitai with the help of Tel Aviv Municipality, on the location of former Hasimta Art Gallery. Regular artists during the first year of the theater's operation included Meir Ariel. These artists did not receive proper salaries, rather were paid a certain percentage of the incomes of their shows.

The theater is active almost every day of the year, and serves as a rehearsal hall in the mornings and a stage for performances in the evenings. Over 54 productions and over 200 plays are presented at the theater per year, and the theater maintains a team of around 135 actors and 96 creators. The place also serves as an exhibition center, and serves as a stage for music and Jazz concerts. "The Alley Bar" also works at the location.

External links

Hasimta Theater official website

Fringe theatre
Israeli culture
Theatres in Jaffa
1982 establishments in Israel